Turkish women have an active participation in many sports branches and have several important trophies, especially in athletics, weightlifting, combat sports, volleyball and basketball.

Participation in Olympics

Pioneers 
The first Turkish women to take part in the Olympic Games were Halet Çambel and Suat Fetgeri Aşani who participated at the fencing competitions of the 1936 Summer Olympics in Berlin.

Medals

Archery

 Yasemin Ecem Anagöz (born 1998), European (2018) and Mediterranean Games (2022) and Islamic Solidarity Games (2021) chaöpion
 Ezgi Başaran (born 2003), Mediterranean Games (2022) champion
 Yeşim Bostan (born 1995), Islamic Solidarity Games (2021) champion
 Gülnaz Büşranur Coşkun (born 1999), European (2018, 2022) and Mediterranean Games (2022) and Islamic Solidarity Games (2021) chaöpion
 Aslı Er, Islamic Solidarity Games (2021) chaöpion
 Ayşe Bera Süzer (born 1996), Islamic Solidarity Games (2021) chaöpion
- Necla Şahin, Islamic Solidarity Games (2021) chaöpion
Sevim Yıldır, Islamic Solidarity Games (2021) chaöpion

Arm wrestling 
 Esma Nur Çakmak (born 2004)
 Esra Kiraz (born 1992)
 Gülendam Sarıbal (born 1972)
 Şükriye Yılmaz (born 2001)

Athletics

National record-holders

World Athletics Championship

European Athletics Championship

Athletics in Mediterranean Games

Şevval Ayaz, Islamic Solidarity Games (2021) champion
Buse Arkazan, pole vault, Islamic Solidarity Games champion (2021)
Özlem Becerek (born 2002), discus throw, Islamic Solidarity Games champion (2021)
 Yasemin Can (born 1996), European (2016),  European Cross Countery (2016, 20117, 2018, 2019), Mediterranean Games (2022) and Islamic Solidarity Games champion (2021)
Emel Dereli (1996), shot put,  Islamic Solidarity Games champion (2021)
Ekaterina Guliyev (born 1991), Mediterranean Games (2022) and Islamic Solidarity Games champion (2021)
Demet Parlak pole vault, Islamic Solidarity Games champion (2021)
Esra Türkmenjavelin throw
, Islamic Solidarity Games (2021) champion

Badminton
 Bengisu Erçetin (born 2001), Mediterranean Games champion in doubles (2022)
 Neslihan Yiğit (born 1994), Islamic Solidarity Games (2013) and Mediterranean Games champion (2013, 2018, 2022)

Basketball 

The Turkish Women's National Basketball Team, also known as "Periler" (The Fairies) by the Turkish fans,  is No 13 in FIBA World Rankings.

European Women Basketball Championship

Mediterranean Games

Players
 Nevriye Yılmaz (born 1980), retired national team player
 Birsel Vardarlı (born 1984), retired national team player
 Işıl Alben (born 1986), team captain

Referees
 Özlem Yalman (born 1977), FIBA-listed referee since 2011.
 Funda Teoman (born 1984), referee

Bocce
İnci Ece Öztürk, Islamic Solidatity Games (2021) champion
Rukiye Varol, Islamic Solidatity Games (2021) champion

 Bahar Çil Mediterranean Geams champion (2022)
 Buket Öztürk (born 2001), Mediterranean Geams champion (2022)
 İnci Ece Öztürk (born 1997), Mediterranean Geams champion (2022)

Boxing

 Hatice Akbaş (born 2002), world (2022), European (2022) and Mediterranean Games  champion (2022)
 Ayşe Çağırır (born 1995), world champion
 Buse Naz Çakıroğlu (born 1996), world and European champion
 Nurcan Çarkçı, European champion
 Şennur Demir, (born 1982) world champion
 Sümeyra Kaya, European champion
 Busenaz Sürmeneli (born 1998), Olympics (2020), world (2019, 2022) and Mediterranean Games  champion (2022)
 Hülya Şahin (born 1974), world and European champion 
 Sabriye Şengül (born 1988)
 Gülsüm Tatar (born 1985), world and European champion 
 Şemsi Yaralı (born 1982), world and European champion 
 Serpil Yassıkaya, European champion

Cycling
 Esra Kürkçü, Balkan champion
 Semra Yetiş, Balkan champion

Fencing

 Suat Aşani (born 22 September 1916, date of death unknown)
 Halet Çambel (1916–2014), 1936 Olympian
 Almila Birçe Durukan, Islamic Solidarity Games (2021) champion
 Lal Erman, Islamic Solidarity Games (2021) champion
 Aleyna Ertürk, Islamic Solidarity Games (2021) champion
 Özden Ezinler (born 1950)
 Gökçe Günaç, Islamic Solidarity Games (2021) champion
 Firuze Ayşen Güneş, Islamic Solidarity Games (2021) champion
 Alisa İsbir, Islamic Solidarity Games (2021) champion
 İrem Karamete (born 1993), Islamic Solidarity Games (2021) champion
 Iryna Shchukla Çiçek (born 1995), Islamic Solidarity Games (2021) champion
 Damlanur Sönmüş, Islamic Solidarity Games (2021) champion

Football 

Women's football in Turkey began with the establishment of the all-women's club Dostlukspor in Istanbul in early 1970s. Turkey women's national football team was established in 1995.

Notable footballers
Merve Aladağ (born 1993)
Sevgi Çınar (born 1994)
Bilgin Defterli (born 1980)
Sibel Duman (born 1990)
Eylül Elgalp (born 1991)
Esra Erol (born 1985)
Melahat Eryurt (born 1975)
Leyla Güngör (born 1993)
Başak İçinözbebek (born 1994)
Lale Orta (born 1960)
Hatice Bahar Özgüvenç (born 1984)
Zeliha Şimşek (born 1981)
Ebru Topçu (born 1996)
Yağmur Uraz (born 1990)
Cansu Yağ (born 1990)
Aylin Yaren (born 1989)

 Managers

Özlem Araç (born 1989)
Cemile Timur (born 1988)

Referees
Necla Akdoğan (born 1971)
Drahşan Arda (born 1945), world first female referee
Leman Bozacıoğlu
İpek Emiroğlu (born 1992)
Elif Köroğlu
Mürvet Yavuztürk (born 1985)

FIFA listed refereesː

Freediving
Derya Can Göçen (born 1979), world record holder
Yasemin Dalkılıç (born 1979), world record holder
Şahika Ercümen (born 1985), world record holder
Birgül Erken (born 1972)
Fatma Uruk (born 1988), world champion and world record holder

Gymnastics

Aerobic gymnastics 
Ayşe Begüm Onbaşı (born 2001), World (2021), Mediterranean Games (2021) and Islamic solidarity Games (2021)  Championships

Artistic gymnastics 
 Sevgi Seda Kayışoğlu, Islamic Solidarity Games (2021) champion
Bilge Tarhan (born 2004), Islamic Solidarity Games (2021) champion
Göksu Üçtaş (1990), Islamic Solidarity Games (2021) champion
Bengisu Yıldız, Isşamic Solidarity Games (2021) champion
Tutya Yılmaz (born 1999), gold medalist

Rhythmic gymnastics 
Duygu Doğan (born 2000), European gold medalist in the 3 Hook + 4 clubs event

Handball 

The Turkish Women's Handball League was established in 1978.

In the Mediterranean Games

Tuana Akman, Islamic Solidarity Games (2021) champion
Elif Sıla Ayfın (born 1996), Islamic Solidarity Games (2021) champion
Neslihan Çalışkan, Islamic Solidarity Games (2021) champion
Ceren Demirçelen, Islamic Solidarity Games (2021) champion
Meryem Erdoğan, Islamic Solidarity Games (2021) champion
Emine Gökdemir, Islamic Solidarity Games (2021) champion
Nurceren Akgün Göktepe, Islamic Solidarity Games (2021) champion
Atiye Gülseven, Islamic Solidarity Games (2021) champion
Halime İslamoğlu, Islamic Solidarity Games (2021) champion
Beyza Karaçam, Islamic Solidarity Games (2021) champion
Merve Özbolluk (born 1994), Islamic Solidarity Games (2021) champion
Bile Nur Öztürk, Islamic Solidarity Games (2021) champion
Kübra Sarıkaya, Islamic Solidarity Games (2021) champion
Ayşegül Sormaz, Islamic Solidarity Games (2021) champion
Yasemin Şahin (born 1988), Islamic Solidarity Games (2021) champion
Gülcan Tügel, Islamic Solidarity Games (2021) champion
Betül Yılmaz (born 1988), Islamic Solidarity Games (2021) champion

Ice hockey
Turkish national women's ice hockey team was established in 2006.

Judo
 Tuğçe Beder, Islamic Solidarity Games (2021) champion
 Belkıs Zehra Kaya (born 1984), Mediterranean Games champion (2005)
 Kayra Sayit (born 1988), European (2016, 2021), Mediterranean Games (2018, 2022) and Islamic Solidarity Games (2021) champion
 Neşe Şensoy (born 1974), Mediterranean Games champion (2001)
Nurcan Yılmaz, Islamic Solidarity Games (2021) champion

Karate
Dilara Bozan (born 1997),  Islamic Solidarity Gamrs (2021) champion

Eda Eltemur (born 1999), European champion
Serap Özçelik (born 1988), European champion
Tuba Yakan (born 1991), Islamic Solidarity Gamrs (2021) champion

Kickboxing
Emine Arslan, Islamic Solidarity Gamrs (2021) champion
Feyzanur Azizoğlu, Islamic Solidarity Gamrs (2021) champion
Gözde Nur Göktaş, Islamic Solidarity Gamrs (2021) champion
Kübra Kocakuş, Islamic Solidarity Gamrs (2021) champion
Bediha Taçyıldız, Islamic Solidarity Gamrs (2021) champion
Hayriye Türksoy Hançer, Islamic Solidarity Gamrs (2021) champion

Modern pentathlon
İlke Özyüksel (born 1997), first ever Turkish Olympian

Rowing
Fitnat Özdil (1910–1993)
Melek Özdil (1916– )
Nezihe Özdil (1911–1984)
Vecihe Taşçı (1905–2002)

Sailing 
 Windsurfing
 Lena Erdil 2018 PWA World Cup

Shooting
Sena Can, Islamic Dolidarity Games )2021) champion
Safiye Sarıtürk Temizdemir, Islamic Dolidarity Games )2021) champion

Swimming 

 Ekaterina Avramova (born 1991), Islamic Solidarity Games (2021) champion
 Beril Böcekler (born 2004), Islamic Solidarity Games (2021) champion
 İlknur Nihan Çakıcı, Islamic Solidarity Games (2021) champion
 Ecem Dönmez, Islamic Solidarity Games (2021) champion
 Sezin Eligül, Islamic Solidarity Games (2021) champion
 Deniz Ertan (born 2004), Mediterranean Games (2022) and Islamic Solidarity Games (2021)  champion
 Viktoriya Zeynep Güneş (born 1998), European (2021), Mediterranean Games (2022) and Islamic Solidarity Games (2021) champion
 Defne Taçyıldız (born 2003), Islamic Solidarity Games (2021) champion
 Merve Tuncel (born 2005), Mediterranean Games (2022) and Islamic Solidarity Games (2021) champion

Table tennis

Meral Yıldız Ali (born 1987)
Melek Hu (born 1989)
Özge Yılmaz, Islamic Solidarity Games champion (2021)

Taekwondo

 Zeliha Ağrıs (born 1998), world and European champion
 Dürdane Altunel
 Furkan Asena Aydın, world and European champion
 Arzu Ceylan, European champion
 Nuray Deliktaş, European champion
 Merve Dinçel (born 1999), European (2022) and MediterraneanGames champion (2022)
 Ayşegül Ergin, 1992 Olympian
 Yeliz Fındık, European champion
 Sibel Güler, 2008 Olympian, European champion
 Hatice Kübra İlgün (born 1993), European (2022) and Mediterranean Games champion (2022)
 Nafia Kuş (born 1995), European (2018), Mediterranean Games  (2022) and Islamic Solidarity Games (2017) champion
 Zeynep Murat, European champion
 Burcu Sallakoğlu
 Kadriye Selimoğlu, world champion
 Arzu Tan, world champion
 Azize Tanrıkulu, 2008 Olympian, European champion
 Ayşenur Taşbakan, European champion
 Nur Tatar, 2012 Olympian, world and European champion
 Hamide Bıkçın Tosun, 2000 Olympian, world champion
 Sude Yaren Uzunçavdar, Islamic Solidarity Games (2021) champion
 İrem Yaman, world champion
 Hatice Kübra Yangın, European champion
 Tennur Yerlisu, world and European champion
 Gülnur Yerlisu, European champion
 Rukiye Yıldırım (born 1991), European (2010, 2018), Mediterranean Games (2018) and Islamic Solidarity Games (2017, 2021) champion

Tennis

Some notable Turkish female tennis players include:
 Başak Eraydın
 Çağla Büyükakçay, Olympian tennis player
 Pemra Özgen
 İpek Soylu
 İpek Şenoğlu
 Melis Sezer
 Vecihe Taşçı (1905–2002)

Volleyball

National teams
The Turkish
 Women's National Team is also known as "Filenin Sultanları" (Sultans of the Net).

Club teams

Fenerbahçe won the 2011–12 CEV Women's Champions League. Vakıfbank is the winner of the 2013 Club World Championship and the 2012–13 CEV Champions League. Bursa Büyükşehir Belediyespor won the 2014–15 CEV Women's Challenge Cup.

Ezgi Akyaldız, Islamic Solidarity Games (29021) champion
Ayçin Akyol, Islamic Solidarity Games (29021) champion
Emine Arıcı, Islamic Solidarity Games (29021) champion
İlkin Aydın (born 2000), Islamic Solidarity Games (29021) champion
Zeynep Sude Demirel (born 2000), Islamic Solidarity Games (29021) champion
Yaprak Erkek, Islamic Solidarity Games (29021) champion
Buket Gülübay, Islamic Solidarity Games (29021) champion
 İdil Naz Kanbur, Islamic Solidarity Games (29021) champion
Ceren Kapucu (born 1993), Islamic Solidarity Games (29021) champion
Buse Kayacan Sonsırma, Islamic Solidarity Games (29021) champion
Aslıhan Kılıç (born 1998), Islamic Solidarity Games (29021) champion
Yasemin Yıldırım, Islamic Solidarity Games (29021) champion
Melis Yılmaz (born 1997), Islamic Solidarity Games (29021) champion
Tutku Burcu Yüzgenç, Islamic Solidarity Games (29021) champion

Water polo
National team players:

Weightlifting
 Duygu Alıcı, Islamic Solidarity Games (2021) champion
 Emine Bilgin, European champion 
 Ayşegül Çoban, European champion 
 Aylin Daşdelen, European champion 
 Nuray Güngör, Islamic Solidarity Games (2021= champion
 Şaziye Erdoğan (born 1992), European champion
 Dilara Narin (born 2002), Islamic Solidarity Games (2021) vhampion
 Aysel Özkan, Islamic Solidarity Games (2021) champion
 Sibel Özkan, European champion 
 Şule Şahbaz, European champion 
 Sibel Şimşek, European champion 
 Nurcan Taylan, Olympic, world and European champion
 Dilara Uçan (born 2002), Islamic Solidarity Games (2021= champion

Wrestling
 Yasemin Adar (born 1991), world (2017) and European champion (2016, 2017, 2018, 2019, 2022)
 Evin Demirhan (born 1995), European champion (2022), Mediterranean Games champion (2018, 2022)
 Bediha Gün (born 1994), Mediterranean Games champion (2018, 2022)
Buse Tosun (born 1995), Mediterranean Games (2018) and Islamic Solidarity Games (2021) champiom

Para Archery
Handan Biroğlu (born 1981), para-archer
Öznur Cüre (born 1997), World (2021) and Islamic Solidarity Games (2021) champion
Burcu Dağ (born 1981), world champion para-archer
Gizem Girişmen (born 1981), Paralympic champion archer
Merve Nur Eroğlu (born 1993), Islamic Solidarity Games (2021) champion
Nil Mısır (born 1987), Islamic Solidarity Games (2021) champion
Gülbin Su (born 1971), Paralympian archer

Para  Athletics

Hamide Kurt (born 1993), Paralympian sprinter
Sümeyye Özcan (born 1992), Paralympian middle-distance runner
Zübeyde Süpürgeci (born 1993), sprinter,Wprşd Athletics European (2021), European (2016, 2018), 
Mediterranean Games (2018) and Islamic Similarity Games (2921) champion

Goalball
Sevda Altınoluk (born 1994), Paralympic gold medalist goalball player
Buket Atalay (born 1990), Paralympic gold medalist goalball player
Gülşah Düzgün (born 1995), Paralympic gold medalist goalball player 
Neşe Mercan (born 1994), Paralympic gold medalist goalball player 
Sümeyye Özcan (born 1992), Paralympic gold medalist goalball player
Zeynep Yetgil, Islamic Soldiarity Games (2021) champion
Seda Yıldız (born 1998), Paralympic gold medalist goalball player

Para Judo
Nazan Akın (born 1983), Paralympic medalist judoka
Duygu Çete (born 1989), Paralympic medalist judoka
Mesme Taşbağ (born 1981), European champion, Paralympic medalist judoka
Ecem Taşın (born 1991), Paralympic medalist judoka

Powerlifting
Özlem Becerikli (born 1980), Paralympic medalist powerlifter
Çiğdem Dede (born 1980), Paralympic medalist powerlifter
Nazmiye Muslu (born 1979), Paralympic and world champion powerlifter

Para Shooting
 Çağla Baş (born 1992), wheelchair basketball player and Paralympic shooter
Aysel Özgan (born 1978), sport shooter
Ayşegül Pehlivanlar (born 1979), sport shooter

Para Swimming
Emine Avcu, Islamic Solidarity Games (2021) champion
Sümeyye Boyacı (born 2003), Paralympian (2016), world champion (2022) and Islamic Soidarity Games champion (2021)
Özlem Kaya (born 1992), Paralympian (2012, 2016)
Şevval Beren Mutlu, Islamic Solidarity Games champion (2021)
Sevilay Öztürk (born 2003), Paralympian (2016), Islamic Solidarity Games champion (2021)

Para Table tennis
Merve Cansu Demir, Islamic Solidarity Games (2021) champion
Ümran Ertiş (born 1996), Paralympic medalist, European (2013) and Islamic Solidarity Games (2021) champion
Neslihan Kavas (born 1987), Paralympic medalist, European (2013)  and Islamic Solidarity Games (2021) champion
Kübra Öçsoy (born 1994), Paralympic medalist, European champion table tennis player

Para Taekwondo
 Meryem Betül Çavdar (born 2000), European champion
 Nurcihan Ekinci, European champion
 Seçil Er, world and European champion
 Gamze Gürdal, European champion

Wheelchair tennis
Büşra Ün (born 1994), first Paralympic competitor

References

External links

A Turkish Sports Page

 
Women